Sarcaulus oblatus is a species of plant in the family Sapotaceae. It is endemic to Ecuador.

References

oblatus
Flora of Ecuador
Vulnerable plants
Taxonomy articles created by Polbot